This is a list of High Sheriffs of Merseyside. The High Sheriff is the Queen's judicial representative in Merseyside, serving a one year term starting on 25 March.

1974–1975: Kenneth Maxwell Stoddart, JP, DL, of 6 The Knowe, Willaston, Wirral, Cheshire
1975–1976: Lieutenant Colonel Frank Vernon Denton, of Formby, Liverpool
1976–1977: Stephen Minion of Liverpool
1977–1978: Lieutenant Colonel George Fortnum Appleton of Shore House, Ainsdale, Southport
1978–1979: Major Henry Bertram Chrimes of Bracken Bank, Heswall, Wirral
1979–1980: Joseph Alexander Duncan of Home Farm, Landican, Birkenhead
1980–1981: Colonel Herbert Gerrard Thomas McClellan of Westwood, Hightown, Liverpool
1981–1982: Major Philip Johnson, JP, of Kandy, Eccleston, St. Helens
1982–1983: Lieutenant Colonel Derek Isaac Heys of Fairway Cottage, West Kirby
1983–1984: Henry Brussell Bicket of Liverpool
1984–1985: Lieutenant Colonel Charles Henry Elston of  Hoylake, Wirral
1985–1986: Colonel Dudley F Moore of Dunes Drive. Freshfield
1986–1987: Henry Egerton Cotton of Norwood, Grassendale Park, Liverpool
1987–1988: Colonel Mary Creagh of  Formby
1988–1989: Lieutenant Colonel Francis John Kevin Williams, of 'Fairfield', Brimstage, Wirral
1989–1990: Colonel D. R. Morgan, of Birkdale, Southport, Merseyside
1990–1991: Commander Edward John Billington, of Gowan Brae, Dawstone Road, Heswall, Wirral
1991–1992: Mrs Jean Wotherspoon, of Elm Lodge, Hard Lane, Dentons Green, St. Helens, Merseyside
1992–1993: Alan William Waterworth, of Crewood Hall, Kingsley, Frodsham, Cheshire
1993–1994:Commodore Roderick H Walker 
1994–1995: Mrs Anita Samuels
1995–1996: Anthony Shone
1996–1997: Mrs. Jennifer Anne Grundy, of Roby, Liverpool, Merseyside.
1997–1998: Brian Thaxter
1998–1999: Colonel Sir Christopher Hewetson
1999–2000: Derek Morris
2000–2001: William David Fulton of Puddington
2001–2002: Professor. Peter Toyne of Rotherham.
2002–2003: Lady Pilkington
2003–2004: Robert D Atlay 
2004–2005: Stuart Christie of Liverpool.
2005–2006: Mrs Rosemary Helen Hawley of Liverpool
2006–2007: Michael Stuart Potts Esq, DL of Neston
2007–2008: Professor Philip N Love CBE DL of Formby
2008–2009: Mrs Judith Louise Greensmith, DL of the Wirral
2009–2010: David C McDonnell Esq, CBE DL of Liverpool
2010–2011: Roy Alfred Morris Esq, DL of Formby
2011–2012: Professor Helen M L Carty, DL of Liverpool
2012–2013: Colonel Martin G.C. Amlôt, OBE OStJ DL of the Wirral
2013–2014: R Ian S Meadows Esq, OBE DL of Liverpool
2014–2015: Abila Pointing
2015–2016: Robert Owen of Woolton, Liverpool
2016–2017: James Christopher Meredith Davies, OBE, DL, of Caldy, Wirral.
2017–2018: Stephen Burrows, DL, of Willaston, South Wirral
2018–2019: Peter David Martin Woods, DL, of Liverpool.
2019–2020: David Steer, QC, DL, of St Helen's.

References

 
Merseyside
Local government in Merseyside
High Sheriff